Sovpolye is a rural locality (a village) in Sovpolskoye Rural Settlement of Mezensky District, Arkhangelsk Oblast, Russia. The population was 38 as of 2010. There are 4  streets.

Geography 
Sovpolye is located on the Sova River, 96 km southwest of Mezen (the district's administrative centre) by road. Chizhgora is the nearest rural locality.

References 

Rural localities in Mezensky District